Qaleh Zari (also Romanized as Qal‘eh Zarī and Qal‘eh Zārī; also known as Chāh Qaleh Zari) is a village in Qaleh Zari Rural District of Jolgeh-ye Mazhan District, Khusf County, South Khorasan province, Iran. At the 2006 National Census, its population was 1,651 in 395 households, when it was in the former Khusf District of Birjand County. The following census in 2011 counted 1,545 people in 403 households.

The latest census in 2016 showed a population of 1,288 people in 340 households, by which time the district had been separated from the county and Khusf County established with two new districts. It was the largest village in its rural district.

References 

Khusf County

Populated places in South Khorasan Province

Populated places in Khusf County